Francis Joseph "Lefty" O'Doul (March 4, 1897 – December 7, 1969) was an American Major League Baseball player who went on to become an extraordinarily successful manager in the minor leagues. He was also a vital figure in the establishment of professional baseball in Japan.

Career

Player
Born in San Francisco, California, in the Bayview neighborhood, O'Doul began his professional career as a left-handed pitcher with the minor-league San Francisco Seals of the Triple-A Pacific Coast League. He pitched for the Red Sox in one notable game at Cleveland on July 7, 1923, that would go down in the record books. Relieving for starter Curt Fullerton, O'Doul gave up 16 runs over 3 innings of relief, with 14 of those runs coming in the 6th inning alone. Although errors committed by Red Sox fielders meant that only 3 of the 16 runs were earned, O'Doul set the major league record for most runs allowed by a reliever in one appearance, a record later equaled by St. Louis Cardinals pitcher Johnny Stuart in 1925 and Philadelphia Phillies pitcher Dutch Schesler in 1931 (although both needed 8 innings to allow 16 runs). Following the season, O'Doul developed a sore arm, which forced him to give up pitching.

After the 1923 season, the New York Giants returned O'Doul to the Pacific Coast League, where he was converted to a power-hitting outfielder. In 1927, he became the second of only four Pacific Coast League hitters to have hit 30 home runs and stolen 30 bases in a season (with the other three being Tony Lazzeri (1925), Frank Demaree (1934), and Joc Pederson (2014)).

O'Doul returned to the majors in 1928, where he batted .319 as a platoon player. In , he was traded to the Philadelphia Phillies and, teaming up with Chuck Klein, had one of the best offensive years in baseball history, leading the league in batting at .398 with 254 hits, 32 home runs, 122 runs batted in, and 152 runs scored. His hit total broke the previous National League record of 250 by Rogers Hornsby of the 1922 St. Louis Cardinals.

After batting .383 with 22 homers during the 1930 season, O'Doul was traded to the Brooklyn Robins (now the Los Angeles Dodgers). In , he batted .368 for Brooklyn to win another league batting title.

In an 11-year major league career, he played in 970 games, 34 as a relief pitcher and the rest as an outfielder, posting a .349 batting average with 624 runs scored, 175 doubles, 41 triples, 113 home runs, and 542 runs batted in. His on-base percentage was .413 and slugging percentage was .532. In seven seasons between 1928 and 1934, when he became a regular outfielder, he hit .353. O'Doul hit over .300 six times, missing only in 1933 when he hit .284 playing with the Dodgers and Giants. He had 200+ hit seasons in 1929, 1930 and 1932. He had 6 five-hit games between 1929 and 1933, recording two each in 1929 and 1930 with the Phillies and one each in 1931 and 1933 with the Dodgers.

Manager
One of his outstanding accomplishments while managing the Seals was developing the young Joe DiMaggio, who went on to a Hall of Fame career with the New York Yankees. O'Doul refused to take credit for DiMaggio's success, saying, "I was just smart enough to leave him alone."

Legacy
O'Doul was instrumental in spreading baseball's popularity in Japan, serving as the sport's goodwill ambassador before and after World War II. The Tokyo Giants, sometimes considered "Japan's Baseball Team", were named by him in 1935 in honor of his longtime association with the New York Giants; the logo and uniform of the Giants in Japan strongly resemble their North American counterparts.

O'Doul was inducted into the San Francisco Bay Area Sports Hall of Fame in 1981 and the Japanese Baseball Hall of Fame in 2002. O’Doul was inducted into the Baseball Reliquary's Shrine of the Eternals in 2013.

O'Doul's fame and popularity live on in his hometown of San Francisco and are enhanced by the fact that his former team now thrives as the San Francisco Giants. The popular hofbrau-style restaurant and bar he founded in 1958 operated for years after his death as Lefty O'Doul's Restaurant and Cocktail Lounge on Geary Street, still serving his original recipe for Bloody Mary (although one news account says it was modified in the 1960s by O'Doul's bartender Chuck Davis). However, a landlord-tenant dispute caused the restaurant to close its doors in early 2017. In November 2018, the restaurant reopened in a new location at Fisherman's Wharf. However, the new location closed in 2020 during the COVID-19 pandemic and the owner's bankruptcy following a federal indictment on corruption charges.

A bridge over McCovey Cove, near the Giants' home field of Oracle Park, is named the Lefty O'Doul Bridge in his honor. Accordingly, the ballpark plaza and gate entrance adjacent to the bridge are also named after O'Doul.

Besides the ineligible Shoeless Joe Jackson, O'Doul has the highest career batting average of any player eligible for the National Baseball Hall of Fame who is not enshrined. On November 5, 2021, he was selected to the final ballot for the Baseball Hall of Fame's Early Days Committee for consideration in the Class of 2022. He received five of the necessary twelve votes.

See also

 List of Major League Baseball batting champions
 American expatriate baseball players in Japan
 The Glory of Their Times, 1966 book

References

Further reading
 Leutzinger, Richard. "Lefty O'Doul and the Development of Japanese Baseball". The National Pastime, no. 12 (1992), pp. 30–34. .
 Leutzinger, Richard. Lefty O’Doul, the Legend That Baseball Nearly Forgot: The Story of the Hall of Fame's Missing Star. Carmel, California: Carmel Bay Publishing Group, 1997. .
 Dobbins, Dick; Twichell, Jon (editor: Rochmis, Jon). Nuggets on the Diamond, Professional Baseball in the Bay Area from the Gold Rush to the Present. San Francisco, California: Woodford Press, 1994. ; .
 Snelling, Dennis. Lefty O'Doul: Baseball's Forgotten Ambassador. University of Nebraska Press, 2017.  ;

External links

Lefty O'Doul at SABR (Baseball BioProject)

1897 births
1969 deaths
Baseball developers
Baseball players from San Francisco
Boston Red Sox players
Brooklyn Dodgers players
Brooklyn Robins players
Burials at Cypress Lawn Memorial Park
Des Moines Boosters players
Hollywood Stars players
Japanese Baseball Hall of Fame inductees
Major League Baseball left fielders
Major League Baseball pitchers
Major League Baseball hitting coaches
National League All-Stars
National League batting champions
New York Giants (NL) players
New York Yankees players
Oakland Oaks (baseball) managers
Pacific Coast League MVP award winners
Philadelphia Phillies players
Salt Lake City Bees players
San Francisco Giants coaches
San Francisco Seals (baseball) managers
San Francisco Seals (baseball) players
Vancouver Mounties players
Bayview–Hunters Point, San Francisco